Pardomima callixantha is a moth in the family Crambidae. It was described by Edward L. Martin in 1955. It is found in Mali, Angola, the Democratic Republic of the Congo (Katanga), Ethiopia, Ghana, Ivory Coast, Kenya, Malawi, South Africa (KwaZulu-Natal, Gauteng), Sudan, Zambia and Zimbabwe.

References

Moths described in 1955
Spilomelinae